Eloping with the Sun is an album by William Parker, Joe Morris & Hamid Drake which was recorded in 2001 and released in a limited edition on Morris' Riti label.

Reception

In his review for AllMusic, Eugene Chadbourne states "Three musicians who play together regularly, much of their music totally improvised, get together for another recording session that will feature not their normal instruments but a variation that is deliberately stripped quite bare... This instrumental concept means a much less heavy type of assault than is usual for these artists, yet this becomes a special treasure, a demonstration of expressive mastery"

The All About Jazz review said "The surprise in the pairing of these three creative music superstars is not that they have finally recorded together. The astonishing thing about Eloping With The Sun is the music they decided to make". JazzTimes noted "Morris has plenty of solo space on the disc, as Drake and Parker content themselves with setting a groove and sticking with it for minutes on end. The heart of the music is Drake and Parker's slowly evolving rhythms, however, which leaves Morris standing off to the side".

Track listing
All compositions by William Parker, Joe Morris and Hamid Drake
 "Sand Choir" - 7:59  
 "Dawn Son" - 2:04  
 "Hop-kin" - 16:49  
 "Stepdance" - 12:53  
 "Dream" - 15:48

Personnel
William Parker - sintir
Joe Morris - banjo, banjouke
Hamid Drake - frame drum

References

2003 albums
Joe Morris (guitarist) albums
William Parker (musician) albums